Jeffrey O'Neill (born February 23, 1976) is a Canadian broadcaster and former professional ice hockey player in the National Hockey League (NHL). He played 12 seasons with the Hartford Whalers, Carolina Hurricanes and the Toronto Maple Leafs.

Playing career

Minor hockey
O'Neill grew up in the community of King City, north of Toronto, playing minor hockey for the King City Kings MHA as a youth. He grew up with two older brothers, Don and Ryan, both of whom played hockey. O'Neill played in the 1990 Quebec International Pee-Wee Hockey Tournament with the Richmond Hill-Vaughan Kings minor ice hockey team from the Ontario Minor Hockey Association. As a 14-year-old, he played at the Midget level with his brother Ryan — almost three years younger than some of his peers. At 15, O'Neill signed with the Thornhill Thunderbirds Jr. A club (OHA), whose coach Scott McLennan stated he had the skills to make it to the Ontario Hockey League. O’Neill's number was later retired by the Thunderbirds in 2004. He finished his rookie season second in the Metro Junior Hockey League in scoring.

O'Neill was the first overall selection of the Guelph Storm in the 1992 OHL Priority Selection, held at Maple Leaf Gardens in June 1992. He was named OHL Rookie of the Year that year after scoring 79 points in 65 games with the upstart Storm. His point total of 79 for a 16-year-old was the second highest total by a 16-year-old since Kirk Muller recorded 112 with the Guelph Platers in 1982–83. He also played in the American Hockey League for the Springfield Falcons. O'Neill spent three years in the OHL with the Storm before jumping to the NHL with the Hartford Whalers in 1995. Also in 1995 he represented Canada at the world junior hockey championships, winning a gold medal.

NHL
O'Neill was drafted in the first round, fifth overall by the Hartford Whalers (now Carolina Hurricanes) in the 1994 NHL Entry Draft. He went to the 2002 Stanley Cup Final with the Hurricanes before losing to the Detroit Red Wings. O'Neill was selected to the Eastern Conference team for the 2002–03 NHL All-Star Game.

After joining the Whalers in 1995, he spent the next two seasons in Hartford before following the franchise to North Carolina in 1997. His point production increased after he arrived in Carolina, scoring at least 30 goals per season each year between 2000 and 2003. After his brother was killed in a car accident in Toronto in July 2005, O'Neill expressed a desire to play for the Maple Leafs, his hometown team, in order to be closer to family. On July 30, 2005, Carolina GM Jim Rutherford traded O'Neill to the Toronto Maple Leafs for a conditional draft pick in the 2006 NHL Entry Draft.

Re-united with former Carolina Hurricanes coach Paul Maurice, O'Neill enjoyed a resurgence early in the 2006–2007 season and, benefiting from playing on the top line with Mats Sundin and Alexander Steen, was briefly one of the top scorers. However, despite scoring 20 goals that season, O'Neill was benched for the remaining few games due to poor offensive performance. His poor performance combined with his fear of flying led him to consider retirement at the end of the season. After sitting out the following season, he was invited to the 2008-09 Training Camp by his former team, the Carolina Hurricanes. Following training camp, O'Neill played in two exhibition games with the Hurricanes, but opted to retire before the official start of the season.

Broadcasting career
O'Neill is presently a sports broadcaster and hockey analyst with The Sports Network, appearing on Toronto Maple Leafs broadcasts and TSN Hockey programs. He currently co-hosts OverDrive on TSN Radio 1050 with host Bryan Hayes and fellow co-host and former goaltender Jamie McLennan.

Career statistics

Regular season and playoffs

International

References

Further reading

External links

1976 births
Canadian ice hockey right wingers
Canadian people of Irish descent
Carolina Hurricanes players
Guelph Storm players
Hartford Whalers draft picks
Hartford Whalers players
Ice hockey people from Ontario
King City Secondary School alumni
Living people
National Hockey League All-Stars
National Hockey League first-round draft picks
Sportspeople from King, Ontario
Sportspeople from Richmond Hill, Ontario
Toronto Maple Leafs players